The Set Decorators Society of America Award for Best Achievement in Decor/Design of a Science Fiction or Fantasy Feature Film is an annual award given by the Set Decorators Society of America. It honors the work set decorators whose work has been deemed the "best" of a given year, in the genres of science fiction and fantasy film. It was first awarded in 2021.

Winners and nominees

2020s

References

External links
 

2021 film awards
2021 in American cinema